The Klimisch score is a method of assessing the reliability of toxicological studies, mainly for regulatory purposes, that was proposed by H.J. Klimisch, M. Andreae and U. Tillmann of the chemical company BASF in 1997 in a paper entitled A Systematic Approach for Evaluating the Quality of Experimental Toxicological and Ecotoxicological Data which was published in Regulatory Toxicology and Pharmacology. It assigns studies to one of four categories as follows:

The applicable guidelines are the (OECD Guidelines for the Testing of Chemicals, EU Test Methods), and other such methods.  Often studies are performed to more than one test guideline where they are in agreement as to the requirements.  GLP is Good Laboratory Practice.

The scoring system is the standard method used in both the EU regulatory schemes (e.g. REACH Regulation).  Generally, only Klimisch scores of 1 or 2 can be used by themselves to cover an endpoint. However, Klimisch score 3 and 4 data can still be used as supporting studies or as part of a weight of evidence approach. The Klimisch score can be found as a standard field within the IUCLID database.

ECHA has produced guidance on how to assess the reliability of data

Klimisch score has been criticized for favoring studies conducted under Good Laboratory Practice guidelines, which are mostly industry-funded studies. A reliable study according to the Klimisch score can actually be highly flawed. Klimisch score does not assess a number of study design criteria: randomization, blinding, sample size calculation, ….

ToxRTool 

The ToxRTool was developed to assist with Klimisch scoring.

References 

Toxicology